The blackspot allotoca (Allotoca maculata), also known as the blackspot goodeid, tailspot goodeid, or tiro manchado, is a critically endangered species of fish in the family Goodeidae, endemic to the Lago de Magdalena basin near Guadalajara in Jalisco, Mexico.

References

maculata
Freshwater fish of Mexico
Endemic fish of Mexico
Critically endangered biota of Mexico
Critically endangered animals
Fish described in 1980
Taxonomy articles created by Polbot